Wood Lake (/ˈwʊd ˈleɪk/; Spanish: Monte Lacre [ˈmõn̪.te ˈla.kɾe]; French: Bois du Lac) is an Isleño fishing community in St. Bernard Parish, Louisiana, United States. The community is situated along Bayou Terre-aux-Boeufs to the northeast of Delacroix, Louisiana and west of Lake Lery. Following the American Civil War, the community was founded by Isleño hunters, trappers, and fisherman.

References 

Unincorporated communities in St. Bernard Parish, Louisiana